George Boscawen may refer to:
 George Boscawen (British Army officer, born 1712) (1712–1775), MP for Penryn and Truro
 George Boscawen (politician, born 1745) (1745–?), his son, MP for St Mawes and Truro
 George Boscawen, 3rd Viscount Falmouth (1758–1808), British Army officer and statesman
 George Boscawen, 2nd Earl of Falmouth (1811–1852), British politician
 George Boscawen, 9th Viscount Falmouth (born 1919), British Army officer